Vera Zvonareva was the defending champion but was chosen to compete the 2012 Summer Olympics in London instead.
Bojana Jovanovski defeated Julia Cohen 6–3, 6–1 in the final to win the tournament.

Seeds

Draw

Finals

Top half

Bottom half

Qualifying

Seeds

Qualifiers

Draw

First qualifier

Second qualifier

Third qualifier

Fourth qualifier

References
 Main Draw
 Qualifying Draw

Baku Cup - Singles
2012 Singles